RAF Snitterfield  is a former Royal Air Force satellite station located west of Snitterfield, Warwickshire, England,  north of Stratford-upon-Avon and  south-east of Henley-in-Arden, Warwickshire.

Snitterfield was operational during the Second World War, the airfield was a class A airfield and had around 30 aircraft dispersals. The airfield was finished around June 1942 and cost around £1,147,000 and opened in 1943 then closed in 1946.

Posted units

No. 18 (Pilots) Advanced Flying Unit RAF ((P)AFU) was the first unit to operate from the airfield starting on 7 May 1943 at RAF Church Lawford and using Snitterfield as a satellite airfield to disperse the aircraft as Church Lawford was very busy. On 3 April 1945 the unit moved permanently to RAF Snitterfield using Airspeed Oxfords and Miles Magisters.

The airfield was also home to two Belgian training schools firstly the Initial Training School dealing with reception and training elements from 1 January 1944 until 13 December 1944 and secondly the Technical Training School from January 1944 until October 1946.

From May 1945 to 1946, Snitterfield was used as a Relief Landing Ground by No. 20 Service Flying Training School from RAF Church Lawford.

The airfield was also host to other units including:
 No. 1533 Beam Approach Training Flight which joined in 1944 flying the Airspeed Oxford left 3 April 1945.
 No. 21 Flying Training School flying the North American Harvard joined the airfield on 3 April 1945 until 18 September 1946.

Accidents and incidents

During life as a RAF training base accidents were not far away with a number of airmen killed during training and within the surrounding area.

Motor sports usage
In 1948, RAF Snitterfield was one of two disused airfields given special consideration as to the suitability of hosting a British Grand Prix. In the end, RAF Silverstone was chosen as the venue.

Current use
The north-east section of the airfield is currently the Stratford Oaks Golf club and the south-east section is home to Stratford-Upon-Avon Gliding Club. However, before these were built there was a Wireless Transmission station.

At the southern end of the airfield is now Stratford Armouries which is a military museum that was built in 2007.

See also
 List of former Royal Air Force stations

References

Citations

Bibliography

External links
Flickr set of RAF Snitterfield documents
BBC History
 https://www.stratfordgliding.co.uk

Defunct airports in England
Royal Air Force stations in Warwickshire
Royal Air Force stations of World War II in the United Kingdom